The year 1991 was the 20th year after the independence of Bangladesh. It was the first year of the first term of the government of Khaleda Zia.

Incumbents

 President: Shahabuddin Ahmed (acting) (until 10 October)
 Prime Minister: Khaleda Zia (starting 20 March)
 Chief Justice: Shahabuddin Ahmed

Demography

Climate

Cyclone

The 1991 Bangladesh cyclone (IMD designation: BOB 01, JTWC designation: 02B)  was among the deadliest tropical cyclones on record. On the night of 29 April 1991, it struck the Chittagong district of southeastern Bangladesh with winds of around 250 km/h (155 mph). The storm forced a 6-metre (20 ft) storm surge inland over a wide area, killing at least 138,866 people and leaving as many as 10 million homeless.

During 22 April 1991, a circulation formed in the southern Bay of Bengal from a persistent area of convection, or thunderstorms, near the equator in the eastern Indian Ocean. Within two days, the cloud mass encompassed most of the Bay of Bengal, focused on an area west of the Andaman and Nicobar Islands. On 24 April, the India Meteorological Department (IMD) designated the system as a depression, and the Joint Typhoon Warning Center (JTWC) labeled the system as Tropical Cyclone 02B. Ships in the region reported winds of around 55 km/h (35 mph) around this time.

From its genesis, the storm moved northwestward, being gradually strengthened, amplified by a wind surge from the south. By 26 April, wind shear had decreased to near zero as an anticyclone developed aloft the hurricane. Around this time, the cyclone rounded the western periphery of a large subtropical ridge over Thailand, and the storm turned northward between the ridge to the northeast and northwest. On 28 April, the flow of the southwesterlies caused the cyclone to accelerate to the north-northeast. This flow also amplified the storm's outflow, and the cyclone intensified further. By 12:00 UTC on 28 April, or about 31 hours before landfall, the JTWC was correctly forecasting a landfall in southeastern Bangladesh. Early on 29 April, the IMD upgraded the system to a super cyclonic storm – the highest category – and estimated peak winds of 240 km/h (150 mph). The JTWC estimated peak winds of 160 mph (260 km/h), the equivalent to a Category 5 hurricane on the Saffir–Simpson scale or a super typhoon. The cyclone's high winds and low pressure, a rarity for the Bay of Bengal, ranked it among the most intense cyclones in the basin. At 19:00 UTC on 29 April, the cyclone made landfall about 55 km (35 mi) south of Chittagong in southeastern Bangladesh while slightly below its peak strength. Moving through the mountainous terrain of the Chittagong Hill Tracts, the cyclone quickly weakened and crossed into northeast India, where it degenerated into a remnant low-pressure area.

Economy

Note: For the year 1991 average official exchange rate for BDT was 36.60 per US$.

Events

 27 February – 1991 Bangladeshi general election, Bangladesh Nationalist Party emerges victorious.
 29 April – 1991 Bangladesh cyclone kills more than 138,000.
 10 May – President Bush directed the US military to provide humanitarian assistance to Bangladesh under the umbrella of Operation Sea Angel. A Contingency Joint Task Force under the command of Lieutenant General Henry C. Stackpole, consisting of over 400 Marines and 3,000 sailors, was subsequently sent to Bangladesh to provide food, water, and medical care to nearly two million people.
 17 July – Government raised the maximum age limit for entering government job from 27 years to 30 years.
 15 September – A constitutional referendum was held where voters were asked "Should or not the President assent to the Constitution (Twelfth Amendment) Bill, 1991 of the People's Republic of Bangladesh?" The amendments would lead to the reintroduction of parliamentary government, with the President becoming the constitutional head of state, but the Prime Minister the executive head. The result saw 83.6% vote in favour, with a turnout of 35.2%.

Awards and Recognitions

Independence Day Award

Ekushey Padak
Ahmed Sharif (education)
Kabir Chowdhury (literature)
A.F. Salahuddin Ahmed (education)
A.M. Harun-ar-Rashid (science)
Foyez Ahmad (literature)
Sanjida Khatun (literature)
Aminul Huq 
Kazi Abdul Baset (fine arts)

Sports
 South Asian (Federation) Games:
 Bangladesh participated in the fifth South Asian Federation Games held in Colombo, Sri Lanka from 22–31 December. With 4 golds, 8 silvers and 28 bronzes Bangladesh ended the tournament at the fourth position in overall points table.
 Domestic football:
 Brothers Union won Bangladesh Federation Cup title.

Births
 12 February – Shahidul Yousuf Sohel, footballer
 29 May – Rumana Ahmed, cricketer
 5 August – Sohag Gazi, cricketer
 30 November – Nasir Hossain, cricketer

Deaths

 11 March – Principal Abul Kashem, academician (b.1920)
 31 March – Abul Kashem Khan, industrialist (b.1905)
 23 April – Lokman Hossain Fakir, musician (b.1924)
 21 June – Rudra Mohammad Shahidullah, poet (b.1956)
 3 July – Dolly Anwar, actor (b.1941)
 11 October – Golam Samdani Koraishi, author (b.1929)
 3 December – Badruddin Ahmed Siddiky, jurist (b.1915)
 7 December – Ataur Rahman Khan, politician (b.1905)
 22 December – Mirza Nurul Huda, politician (b.1919)

See also 
 1990s in Bangladesh
 List of Bangladeshi films of 1991
 Timeline of Bangladeshi history

Notes

References